The Blind Woman of Sorrento (Italian:La cieca di Sorrento) is a novel by the Italian writer Francesco Mastriani which was first published in 1852. 

The novel has been adapted into other media several times including:
 The Blind Woman of Sorrento (1916 film), a silent Italian film directed by Gustavo Serena
 The Blind Woman of Sorrento (1934 film), an Italian film directed by Nunzio Malasomma 
 The Blind Woman of Sorrento (1952 film), an Italian film directed by Giacomo Gentilomo

References

Bibliography
 Cicioni, Mirna & Di Ciolla, Nicoletta. Differences, Deceits and Desires: Murder and Mayhem in Italian Crime Fiction.  Associated University Presse, 2008. 

1852 novels
19th-century Italian novels
Campania in fiction
Novels set in Italy
Novels by Francesco Mastriani
Italian novels adapted into films